Hachimitsu Rocket (はちみつロケット, stylized in English as Hachimitsu Rocket) is a Japanese girl idol group, formed by Stardust Promotion in November 2014. The group was graduated from 3B Junior in February 2018. The group was dissolved on April 26, 2020.

Members

Current members

Former members

Timeline

Discography

References 

Japanese idol groups
Japanese girl groups
Japanese pop music groups
Child musical groups
Japanese-language singers
Musical groups established in 2015
2015 establishments in Japan
Stardust Promotion artists